Qeshlaq-e Ferunabad (also Romanized as Qeshlāq-e Ferūnābād; also known as Ferūnābād and Forūnābād) is a village in Ferunabad Rural District, in the Central District of Pakdasht County, Tehran Province, Iran. At the 2006 census, its population was 513, in 125 families.

References 

Populated places in Pakdasht County